"Jug wine" is a term in the United States for inexpensive table wine (or "bulk wine") typically bottled in a glass bottle or jug. 

Historically, jug wines were labeled semi-generically, often sold to third parties to be relabeled, or sold directly from the winery's tasting room to customers who would often bring their own bottles.  For a period following Prohibition, jug wines were the only domestic wine available for most Americans.  Beginning in the 1960s, when Americans began to consume more premium wine, jug wine took on a reputation for being "extreme value" (bargain-priced premium wine).  Beginning in the late 1980s jug wines have increasingly been labeled varietally to meet consumer demand.

Common brands
Common brands include Gallo, Carlo Rossi, Almaden Vineyards, and Inglenook Winery.  Typical formats include 750 ml and 1 liter glass bottles, as well as 3 and 5-liter jugs.  More recent packaging methods include lined boxes, and plastic bags inside corrugated fiberboard boxes ("bag in a box").

See also
 Box wine
 Fighting varietal
 Flavored fortified wine
Plonk (wine)

References

Wine styles
Wine terminology